

Konkani may refer to:

Languages
 Konkani language
 Konkani alphabets
 Konkani phonology
 Konkani language agitation
 Konkani dialect (Marathi) (or Maharashtrian Konkani), a dialect of the Marathi language
 Marathi-Konkani languages, languages of the Maharashtra and Konkan region

Dialects of Konkani language
 Goan Konkani
 Malwani
 Chitpavani Konkani
 Karnataka Konkani 
 Canara Konkani
 Karwari Konkani, a Konkani language
 Mangalorean Konkani

Ethnic groups
 Konkani people, south-western India
 People of the Konkan Division, in Konkan, Maharashtra, India
 Konkan, a region in India

See also
 Kokna language (disambiguation) (or Kukna language)

Language and nationality disambiguation pages